Too Much To Know: Managing Scholarly Information before the Modern Age (Yale University Press, 2010) is a bestselling book by the American intellectual historian Ann M. Blair. The book deals with the concept of information overload. Blair argues that the feeling of being overwhelmed by information is not unique to the digital age. Instead it has existed since antiquity and in many cultures.

Reception

The New Yorker named the book as one of the best books of 2011. It was also praised by the Washington Post, Rorotoko, and  Times Higher Education.

References

External links
 Yale University Press
 

2010 non-fiction books
21st-century history books
Books about the media